Nicholas Steward (born 1547, baptized 16 May 1547, died 1 June 1633) of Taplow in Buckinghamshire, later of Hartley Mauditt in Hampshire, was an English politician who sat in the House of Commons  in 1604.

Origins
Steward was the seventh son of Simeon Steward of Lakenheath, Suffolk. His eldest brother was Sir Mark Steward (d.1603), MP. The family, formerly known also as "Styward", claimed descent from a younger son of Alexander Stewart, 4th High Steward of Scotland (d. 1283) (from the elder two sons of whom descended the Stuart kings of Scotland and England) as is described on the monument in Ely Cathedral of Sir Mark Steward (d.1603),  but which connection has been disproven by modern historians and suspected as a fabrication by his relative Robert Steward (d. 1557), the last Prior of Ely Abbey and  the first Dean of Ely Cathedral, "a time-serving prior who assigned generous tracts of dean and chapter lands within the Isle of Ely to numerous relatives"''.

Career
He matriculated at Trinity College, Cambridge at Easter 1560 and was a student at Trinity Hall, Cambridge in August 1564. He was awarded LL.B. in 1568 and was admitted as an advocate on 29 October 1573. In 1574 he was awarded LL.D. In 1604, Steward was elected as one of the first Members of Parliament for the newly created constituency of Cambridge University. Steward purchased the Manor of Hartley Mauditt, Hampshire, in 1603 from the Lancaster Family.

Marriage and issue
In 1572 he married Frances Baker (d.19 March 1609), a daughter and co-heiress of John Baker of Cambridge, a cousin of Matthew Parker, Archbishop of Canterbury. His grandson was Sir Nicholas Steward, 1st Baronet (1618-1710)  "Baronet of Hartley Mauditt", of Pylewell Park in Hampshire, whose descendants adopted the surname "Stuart".

Death and burial
He died in 1633 and was buried in the Church of St Martin-in-the-Fields near Westminster and at his request a monument to him was erected in St. Leonard's Church, Hartley Mauditt.

References

1634 deaths
Members of the pre-1707 Parliament of England for the University of Cambridge
People from Lakenheath
Alumni of Trinity College, Cambridge
Alumni of Trinity Hall, Cambridge
English lawyers
People from Cambridge
17th-century English lawyers
English MPs 1604–1611
People from East Hampshire District
1547 births